Nehru Park, Thrissur, is a children’s park named after first Prime Minister of India Jawaharlal Nehru and is owned by Thrissur Municipal Corporation in Thrissur City of Kerala, India. The park also have aquarium (open 1500 – 2000 hours).

History
The park was inaugurated by the first Vice President of India Sarvepalli Radhakrishnan in 1959.

References

Parks in Thrissur
Tourist attractions in Thrissur
Monuments and memorials to Jawaharlal Nehru